Šilovo may refer to the following places:

 Šilovo (Lebane), a village in the municipality of Lebane, Serbia
 Šilovo (Gnjilane), a village in the municipality of Gnjilane, Kosovo

or:
 Pusto Šilovo, a village in the municipality of Medveđa, Serbia

See also
Dešilovo, a village in the municipality of Merošina, Serbia